Liao Chiung-chih (born 1935 in Keelung) is a well-known Taiwanese gezaixi performer of stage and television. She received a Golden Bell Award in 1990 for her work in television and her lifetime achievements were recognised with a National Cultural Award in 2008 and a National Cultural Heritage Preservation Award in 2012

References

Taiwanese opera actors
1935 births
Living people